Dongalu Baboi Dongalu is a 1984 Indian Telugu-language action film starring Krishna, Radha, Ambika, Satyanarayana and M. Prabhakar Reddy. It was jointly produced by P. Babji and G. Sambasiva Rao. The film directed by K. S. R. Das has musical score by Chellapilla Satyam.

Actor Krishna portrayed the role of twin brothers — Ramu and Krishna. The film was one of the oldest Telugu films to show robots and fictional high tech cars. The film was released on 6 December 1984.

Cast

Lead Characters 
 Krishna as Ramu and Krishna
 Radha as Seetha
 Ambika as Satya
 Satyanarayana as Damodaram
 Prabhakar Reddy as Gangulu

Other Cast 
 Anjali Devi as Annapoorna
 Annapoorna
 Padmanabham
 Ravi Kondala Rao
 Mada

Soundtrack 
The film's soundtrack album comprising 5 tracks was scored and composed by Chellapilla Satyam.
 Thaagina Maikamlo — S.P.B., G. Anand
 Oyi Magada — P. Susheela
 Ososi Kurradana — S.P.B.
 Neelona Naalona — S.P.B., P. Susheela
 Nenante — S.P.B., P. Susheela

References

External links 

1984 films
1980s Telugu-language films
1984 action films
Indian science fiction action films
Films directed by K. S. R. Das
Films scored by Satyam (composer)